The Battle of Malta was a battle that took place in Malta in 1283.

Battle of Malta may also refer to:
 Battle of Malta (poker), a poker tournament established in 2012
 Battle of the Malta Convoy, an 1800 battle

See also
 Siege of Malta (disambiguation)